Assimilation is a sound change in which some phonemes (typically consonants or vowels) change to become more similar to other nearby sounds. A common type of phonological process across languages, assimilation can occur either within a word or between words.

It occurs in normal speech but becomes more common in more rapid speech.  In some cases, assimilation causes the sound spoken to differ from the normal pronunciation in isolation, such as the prefix in- of English input pronounced with phonetic [m] rather than [n]. In other cases, the change is accepted as canonical for that word or phrase, especially if it is recognized in standard spelling: implosion pronounced with [m], composed of in- + -plosion (as in explosion).

In contrast, the word "cupboard", although it is historically a compound of "cup"  and "board" , is always pronounced , never *, even in slow, highly-articulated speech.

Like in those examples, sound segments typically assimilate to a following sound, but they may also assimilate to a preceding one. Assimilation most commonly occurs between immediately adjacent-sounds but may occur between sounds that are separated by others.

Assimilation can be synchronic, an active process in a language at a given point in time, or diachronic, a historical sound change.

A related process is coarticulation in which one segment influences another to produce an allophonic variation, such as vowels becoming nasalized before nasal consonants when the soft palate (velum) opens prematurely or  becoming labialized as in "boot"  or "ball"  in some accents. This article describes both processes under the term assimilation.

Concept
The physiological or psychological mechanisms of coarticulation are unknown, and coarticulation is often loosely referred to as a segment being "triggered" by an assimilatory change in another segment. In assimilation, the phonological patterning of the language, discourse styles and accent are some of the factors contributing to changes observed.

There are four configurations found in assimilations: 
Between adjacent segments.
Between segments separated by one or more intervening segments.
Changes made in reference to a preceding segment
Changes made in reference to a following segment

Although all four occur, changes in regard to a following adjacent segment account for virtually all assimilatory changes and most of the regular ones. Assimilations to an adjacent segment are vastly more frequent than assimilations to a nonadjacent one. Those radical asymmetries might contain hints about the mechanisms involved, but they are not obvious.

If a sound changes with reference to a following segment, it is traditionally called "regressive assimilation". Changes with reference to a preceding segment are traditionally called "progressive". Many find those terms confusing, as they seem to mean the opposite of the intended meaning. Accordingly, a variety of alternative terms have arisen, not all of which avoid the problem of the traditional terms. Regressive assimilation is also known as right-to-left, leading, or anticipatory assimilation. Progressive assimilation is also known as left-to-right, perseveratory, preservative, lagging, or lag assimilation. The terms anticipatory and lag are used here.

Occasionally, two sounds (invariably adjacent) may influence each other in reciprocal assimilation. When such a change results in a single segment with some of the features of both components, it is known as coalescence or fusion.

Assimilation occurs in two different types: complete assimilation, in which the sound affected by assimilation becomes exactly the same as the sound causing assimilation, and partial assimilation, in which the sound becomes the same in one or more features but remains different in other features.

Tonal languages may exhibit tone assimilation (in effect tonal umlaut), but sign languages also exhibit assimilation when the characteristics of neighbouring cheremes may be mixed.

Examples

Anticipatory assimilation to an adjacent segment
Anticipatory assimilation to an adjacent segment is the most common type of assimilation by far, and typically has the character of a conditioned sound change, i.e., it applies to the whole lexicon or part of it.
For example, in English, the place of articulation of nasals assimilates to that of a following stop (handkerchief is pronounced , handbag in rapid speech is pronounced ).

In Italian, voiceless stops assimilated historically to a following :
 Latin  "eight" > It. 
 Latin  "bed" > 
 Latin  – pronounced  "under" > 

Italian otto, letto and sotto are examples of historical restructuring: otto and letto no longer contain /kt/ pronounced [tt], and sotto is no longer the structure /bt/ subject to the partial assimilation of devoicing of /b/ and full assimilation to produce [tt]. Over time, phonetic [tt] as a frequent assimilation of /kt/ and /bt/ was rather reinterpreted as reflecting /tt/. The structural sequence /kt/ is now all but absent in Italian, since all items in popular speech underwent the same restructuring, /kt/ > /tt/. On the rare occasion that Italian /kt/ is encountered, however, the same assimilation that triggered the restructuring can occur at the phonetic level. For example, the medical term ictus 'stroke', a relatively recent direct borrowing from Latin, is usually pronounced [ˈiktus] in deliberate speech, but [ˈittus] is frequent in more casual registers.

 Latin ictus > Italian ictus, pronounced either [ˈiktus] or [ˈittus]

Affrication in English 
The affrication of  has been seen in American English, British English, Australian English, and New Zealand English. It is suspected that this change has occurred due to assimilation.

The study discussed in this paper focuses on how children in pre-school analyze the phonetic aspect of language in order to determine the proper spelling of English words.

Anticipatory assimilation at a distance 
Anticipatory assimilation at a distance is rare and usually merely an accident in the history of a specific word.
Standard Slovene  (a toponym) > Slovene dialect 
Slovene  >  (a mountain ridge)

However, the diverse and common assimilations known as umlaut in which the phonetics of a vowel are influenced by the phonetics of a vowel in a following syllable, are common and in the nature of sound laws. Such changes abound in the histories of Germanic languages, Romance, Insular Celtic, Albanian, and many others.

For example, in the history of English, a back vowel became front if a high front vowel or semivowel (*i, ī, j) was in the following syllable, and a front vowel became higher unless it was already high:
 Proto-Germanic  "mice" > Old English   > Modern English mice
 PGmc  "better" > OE 
 PGmc  "feet" > OE  > ME feet

On the other hand, Proto-Germanic  and  >  respectively before  in the following syllable (Germanic a-mutation) although that had already happened significantly earlier:
PGmc  > OE 
PGmc  > OE 

Another example of a regular change is the sibilant assimilation of Sanskrit in which if there were two different sibilants as the onset of successive syllables, a plain  was always replaced by the palatal :
 Proto-Indo-European - "beard" > Skt. -
 PIE - "gray" > Skt. - "rabbit"
 PIE - "husband's mother' > Skt. -

Lag assimilation to an adjacent segment 
Lag assimilation to an adjacent segment is tolerably common and often has the nature of a sound law.

Proto-Indo-European  becomes  in both Germanic and Italic:  "hill" > PreLat.  > Lat. ; > PGmc  > OE   > hill.

In Polish,  regularly becomes  after a voiceless obstruent:
  'flower', pronounced , instead of 
  'face', pronounced , instead of 

Because of a similar process, Proto-Indo-Iranian  became  in Avestan: Old Avestan  'horse' corresponds to Sanskrit

Lag assimilation at a distance 
Lag assimilation at a distance is rare and usually sporadic (except when part of something broader, as for the Sanskrit - example, above): Greek  > Lat.  "lily".

In vowel harmony, a vowel's phonetics is often influenced by that of a preceding vowel. However, it is difficult to know where and how in the history of Finnish an actual assimilatory change took place. The distribution of pairs of endings in Finnish is just that and is not in any sense the operation of an assimilatory innovation, but it was probably the outbirth of such an innovation long ago.

In the opposite direction, in umlaut, a vowel is modified to conform more closely to the vowel in the next syllable.

Coalescence (fusion) 
Proto-Italic  > Latin , as in  "twice" > Lat. . Also, Old Latin  > Latin  "war".

However, when preceded by a vowel, the *sw sequence becomes :  "my sister",  "a cow with three teats". There is also the famous change in P-Celtic of  -> p. Proto-Celtic also underwent the change  -> b.

See also 
 Assibilation
 Phonological history of English consonant clusters
 Co-articulated consonant
 Consonant harmony
 Crasis
 Deletion (phonology)
 Dissimilation
 Epenthesis
 Labialization
 Palatalization
 Pharyngealization
 Secondary articulation
 Velarization

Notes

References

Citations

Sources 

 Crowley, Terry. (1997) An Introduction to Historical Linguistics. 3rd edition. Oxford University Press.

 
Phonetics